Rhytiphora pedicornis is a species of beetle in the family Cerambycidae. It was described by Johan Christian Fabricius in 1775. It is known from Australia.

References

pedicornis
Beetles described in 1775
Taxa named by Johan Christian Fabricius